The term obelion is applied to that point of the sagittal suture which is on a level with the parietal foramina.

References

External links
 Diagram -- #15 (source here)

Skull